Wiley Aerodrome, formerly Eagle Plains/Wiley Aerodrome , is a registered aerodrome located  north of Eagle Plains, Yukon, Canada.

The aerodrome's gravel runway is actually a small section of the Dempster Highway, with a pull-off ramp area provided to keep aircraft parked clear of the road surface.

References

External links
Page about this airport on COPA's Places to Fly airport directory

Registered aerodromes in Yukon